Raquel Ochoa (born 21 January 1980) is a Portuguese author of novels, biographies and travel literature. In 2009 she was awarded the Prémio Agustina Bessa-Luís for the novel "A Casa-Comboio"., the story of an indo-Portuguese family from Damão and the untold history of Portuguese India, which was also translated and published in Italian.

Life and career
She was born in Lisbon in 1980. and studied law.

Accounts of her travel to several corners of the world are published on her blog  www.omundoleseaviajar.blogspot.com, and she is a regular contributor to various newspapers and magazine.

In 2008 she published two books, O Vento dos Outros – an account of her travels in South America and Bana – Uma vida a cantar Cabo Verde, the biography of Bana, a Cape Verdian singer.

In 2011 her fourth book was published, A Infanta Rebelde, a biography of Princess D. Maria Adelaide de Bragança, who was awarded the Order of Merit by the President of the Republic.

Her second novel, Sem Fim à Vista - a viagem, published in September 2012, is the story of a patient with serious heart problems travelling through Singapore, Malaysia, Indonesia, Australia, New Zealand, Hong Kong, Macau, Sri Lanka.

In May 2014 she published Mar Humano, a historical novel reflecting the journalism practised in Portugal today and in the past century, and at the same time joined the disparate themes of human longevity and the impact of science and evolution on human consciousness.

July 2015 saw the publication of As Noivas do Sultão, a historical novel based on a series of true events from 1793 when, caught by a storm in the Atlantic, the ship carrying the family and harem of the Sultan Mohamed III of Morocco arrived in Lisbon.

Published works
" O Vento dos Outros", travel book, 2008.
" Bana - Uma vida a cantar Cabo Verde", biography, 2008.
" A Casa-Comboio", historical novel, 2010
 "A Infanta Rebelde", biographical novel, 2011
 "Sem Fim à Vista-a viagem", a novel, 2012
 "Mar Humano", historical novel, 2014
 "As Noivas do Sultão", historical novel, 2015
 "Manuel Vicente, a Desmontagem do Desconhecido", short biography, 2017

Prizes
 2008 - Agustina Bessa-Luís literary prize for a first novel, for A Casa Comboio

Travel 
A traveller for 16 years, after several journeys across Europe, she left for India and Nepal at 21. She returned, spending several months at a time in the years that followed.  Since 2004, she spent long periods travelling in South America. At age 33 she went halfway around the world, visiting Singapore, Malaysia, Indonesia, Australia, New Zealand, Hong Kong and Macau, India, Sri Lanka, Morocco and 2013 travelled across South East Asia. She frequently returns to Cape Verde.

Teaching
Since 2008 she has given creative writing classes to students of all ages.

References

 A Casa-Comboio por Raquel Ochoa, por Andreia Moreira
 Fundação José Saramago

External links 
 Blog oficial de Raquel Ochoa
 As crónicas de Viagem de Raquel Ochoa
 Clube de Leitura coordenado pela Raquel Ochoa

Portuguese travel writers
1980 births
Living people
Portuguese women novelists
Women travel writers
21st-century Portuguese novelists
21st-century Portuguese women writers
People from Lisbon